Soundwalk Collective is an international experimental sound art collective founded in 2001 by Stephan Crasneanscki, who was joined by Simone Merli in 2008. The group is based in Berlin and New York. They have engaged in collaborations with other musicians such as the American singer Patti Smith on the Perfect Vision Trilogy.

Work

Composition 
Soundwalk Collective’s musical work emerges from a multidisciplinary approach rooted primarily in psycho- geography and in the exploration of recording and synthesis. Elements of observation of nature, non-linear narrative, ethnography, and anthropology are intertwined in their work.

In order to create following this approach they have travelled across the world from cities to remote locations for long periods of investigation and fieldwork to source the unique materials that form the core of their work.

Notable Collaborations

Since their foundation, Soundwalk Collective have collaborated with numerous musicians including American singer, songwriter and poet Patti Smith, Ethiopian Jazz musician Mulatu Astatke, American photographer Nan Goldin, French-Swiss film director Jean-Luc Godard, minimalist composer, Philip Glass, film director, Abel Ferrera, and French pop singer and actor, Charlotte Gainsbourg. 

They have also written original scores for contemporary dance choreographer Sasha Waltz.

Exhibitions and installations 
Soundwalk Collective have performed at Opéra de Lyon, CTM Festival, KW Institute of Contemporary Art, Barbican Centre, Berghain, Centre Georges Pompidou, Florence Gould Hall, Mobile Art by Zaha Hadid in Hong Kong, Tokyo, New York; MUDAM, MuCEM, Museo Madre, New Museum, The Foundation Carmingac, Louvre Abu Dhabi, Palazzo Reale in Milan, La Triennale, Radialsystem V, documenta14 in Athens and Kassel, Funkhaus in Berlin, Manifesta12 in Palermo.

Selection of solo exhibitions:

 Rubin Museum of Art in New York
 The Bardo National Museum in Tunis
 The Beit Museum in Beirut
 The New York’s Times Square, who hosted the midnight moment Jungle-ized piece, a large participative audio-visual installation in 2016.

Discography

Albums

 Kill The Ego (2008)
 La Brulure (2009)
 Medea (2011)
 Last Beat (2014)
 Sons of the Wind (2014)
 Killer Road (2016
 Khandroma (2016)
 Before Music There Is Blood (2017)
 Transmissions (2017)
 Kreatur (2018)
 Death Must Die (2018)
 What We Leave Behind – Jean-Luc Godard Archives (2018)
 What We Leave Behind – The Remixes (2018)
 What We Leave Behind – Jean-Luc Godard Archives – Artist Edition (2019)
 The Peyote Dance (2019)
 Mummer Love (2019)
 Oscillations (2019)
 The Time of the Night – Fondation Carmignac (2020)
 Peradam (2020)

References 

European artist groups and collectives
Arts in Berlin
Experimental musical groups
2001 establishments in Germany